Mary Doyle (July 21, 1931 – June 8, 1995) was an American theatre actress who also appeared on TV between 1956 and 1982.

Early life and career
Doyle was born in Lincoln, Nebraska, and was the younger sister of actor David Doyle. She acted in productions of the Lincoln Community Playhouse and graduated from the Neighborhood Playhouse School of the Theatre.

Doyle's television appearances included The Philco Television Playhouse, Charlie's Angels and Bridget Loves Bernie, the latter two shows that featured her brother David in prominent roles. She also starred in the 1976 Broadway play Best Friend. Her other work on Broadway included performing in The Glass Menagerie (1983), Clothes for a Summer Hotel (1980), Best Friend (1976), Equus (1974), and King Henry V (1969).

Personal life and death
Doyle was married to producer John A. McQiggan. She died of lung cancer in New York City, at the age of 63.

References

External links

1931 births
1995 deaths
20th-century American actresses
Actresses from Nebraska
American stage actresses
American television actresses
Deaths from lung cancer in New York (state)
20th-century American singers
Actors from Lincoln, Nebraska